Wanadongri is a city and a Municipal Council in Nagpur district in the Indian state of Maharashtra. It has 1st Nagpur DMart. Varsha Shahakar is the first woman Municipal Council President of Wanadongri.

Demographics
 India census, Wanadongri had a population of 17,150. Males constitute 54% of the population and females 46%. Wanadongri has an average literacy rate of 69%, higher than the national average of 59.5%: male literacy is 75%, and female literacy is 62%. In Wanadongri, 17% of the population is under 6 years of age.

References

Cities and towns in Nagpur district